The Jaguar Mark VIII is a luxury four-door automobile introduced by the Jaguar company of Coventry at the 1956 London Motor Show.

Styling
The car shared its  wheelbase with its predecessor, the Jaguar Mark VII M, which outwardly it closely resembled. The most obvious change was a new curved one-piece windscreen. Distinguishing visually between the models is facilitated by changes to the front grille and a curved chrome trim strip below the waistline which allowed the factory to offer a variety of two-tone paint schemes.   In addition the new car had rear spats that were cut back to display more of the rear wheels.  The interior fittings were more luxurious than those of the Mark VII M.

Engine and running gear
The Mark VIII inherited from its predecessor the 3442 cc straight-six engine which it shared with the Jaguar XK140 that appeared two years earlier.    In the Mark VIII, a modified cylinder head known as the 'B' type was used.  Although introduced subsequent to the 'C' type competition head (as used on the C-Type racer and available as an option on the XK 140) this naming made more sense than might at first appear.  The 'B' type head used the larger valves of the 'C' type head, with the smaller intake port diameter of original XK cylinder head that had been introduced on the MK VII, which was now referred to as the 'A' type.  The combination of larger valves with the original intake port diameters allowed faster gas flow at low and medium speeds to promote better low and medium range torque.  As the MK VIII was not likely to be revved as high as the C-Type racers and the XK 140's equipped with the 'C' type head the reduction in flow at high rpm's was not seen to be a disadvantage.

The 'B' type head was painted a light green on the 3.4 litre engines to identify it ( mid-blue on the later mark IX with 3.8 litre engine ) .

The modified head supported by twin SU carburetors, and employing a manual four-speed transmission, meant that advertised engine output was now increased to :
the claimed top speed in excess of 106 mph (170 km/h) was considered impressive, given the car's bulk.   Transmission options included overdrive or a Borg Warner three-speed automatic box.

Production
After a two-year production run of 6,227 units the Mark VIII was replaced by the Jaguar Mark IX.

Motor sport
A Mark VIII, crewed by Dunning and Cash, won first place in the Automatic Transmission class in the 1958 Australian Mobilgas Economy Run, which was a fuel economy contest in which cars were required to cover 1,224 miles in two and a half days.

References

Mark 8
Rear-wheel-drive vehicles
Sports sedans
Cars introduced in 1956